Constantin Stan (born 7 November 1959) is a Romanian sports shooter. He competed in three events at the 1984 Summer Olympics.

References

1959 births
Living people
Romanian male sport shooters
Olympic shooters of Romania
Shooters at the 1984 Summer Olympics
Sportspeople from Bucharest